The Simple Girl is a 1957 West German musical comedy film directed by Werner Jacobs and produced by Artur Brauner. It starred Caterina Valente, Rudolf Prack and Ruth Stephan.

Production
The film  was directed by German director Werner Jacobs and produced by Artur Brauner. The working title was Bravo, Caterina. Horst Wendlandt was line producer and Brauner's wife, Maria, was in charge of costume design. Filming took place in May 1957 at the Spandau Studios in Berlin. The film's sets were designed by the art directors Emil Hasler and Paul Markwitz.

The film premiered on 23 August 1957 at the Thalia in Wiesbaden.

Plot
Caterina Bastiani, a talented young actress, is offered the leading role in a musical. This is her big break but the author of the novel on which the musical is based is less than pleased about this adaption — and he does not think much of Caterina. Caterina meets a girl by accident who has applied to work for the author as a maid. She takes the girl's place in order to prove her talent as an actress and shows up at the author's home as the new maid herself.

Cast
 Caterina Valente as Caterina Bastiani
 Rudolf Prack as Thomas Krauss
 Ruth Stephan as Milli
 Rudolf Platte as Werner Pätzold
 Dorit Kreysler as Mrs. Seidel
 Helen Vita as Eva Krapke
 Peter W. Staub as Pit
 Stefan Haar as Jürgen Krauss
 Richard Allan as Robert Holden
 Hans Olden as Anton Schwarz
 Franz-Otto Krüger as Regisseur
 Henry Lorenzen as Komponist Heino Kies
 Herbert Weißbach as Baron Westhoff
 Edith Adana as Baronin Westhoff

References

Bibliography
 Hans-Michael Bock and Tim Bergfelder. The Concise Cinegraph: An Encyclopedia of German Cinema. Berghahn Books, 2009.

External links

 Artur-Brauner-Archive at the Deutsches Filmmuseum in Frankfurt (German), containing the production files for this movie

1957 films
1957 musical comedy films
German musical comedy films
West German films
1950s German-language films
Films directed by Werner Jacobs
Gloria Film films
Films shot at Spandau Studios
1950s German films